The Richards Building was the headquarters of the U.S. Coast and Geodetic Survey from 1871 to 1929.  It was located in Washington, D.C. on a block immediately south of the United States Capitol.  It was demolished in 1929 to construct the Longworth House Office Building.

Architecture 
The Building was designed by Adolf Cluss.  It consisted of two connected units, a Main Building to the east facing New Jersey Avenue, and a Back Building facing South Capitol Street. The exterior of the Main Building was in the Rundbogenstil style, with red brick walls, brown stone trim, and a red, blue, and green patterned slate roof. It was designed with abundant windows and an innovative ventilation system.

History 
The building was constructed by A. and T. A. Richards in 1871 and rented to the Coast and Geodetic Survey.  The builders structured the building in the form of a hotel with many small rooms, so it could be used as such if the government did not renew its initial 10-year lease.  This caused difficulties as the layout was not well suited to functions such as a printing and lithographic plant, and machine and carpenter shop.

The building was not considered to be sufficiently fire-proof, so when the neighboring Butler Building was constructed as a residence in 1873, the superintendent requested that a portion of that building be constructed to be fire-proof so that it could be rented as storage for valuable and irreplaceable survey records, maps, and engraving plates.

The government purchased the Richards Building outright in 1891. By 1916, the building was considered so inadequate that Secretary of Commerce William C. Redfield reported to Congress that, "were there such a function as a public incendiary, these buildings are among the first that should receive his official attention."  In 1929, the Coast and Geodetic Survey moved to the Department of Commerce Building, and the Richards Building was demolished to construct the Longworth House Office Building.

References 

United States Coast and Geodetic Survey
Demolished buildings and structures in Washington, D.C.
Government buildings in Washington, D.C.
Buildings and structures completed in 1871
Buildings and structures demolished in 1929